The Salaam Bank (SB) is a bank headquartered in Mogadishu, the capital and most populous city of Somalia. Benadir region in South Somalia.

Overview
Salaam Bank was established in February 2011.

As a financial institution, the bank provides personal banking and corporate banking. Its Islamic banking services and facilities include Mudarabah, Murabaha, Musharakah and Istisna'a. Additionally, the bank offers electronic banking, SMS banking, mobile banking and internet debit.

In August 2011, the bank also launched an independent (Kaaftoon) service partnering the institution with Golis Telecom Somalia.

Services
Salaam Bank's personal banking services include current accounts and savings accounts. The current accounts permit clients to pay for utilities through online, mobile, and direct debit orders, receive and wire international transfers, make payments via checks, use the Salaam Debit Card for purchases/withdrawals at ATM and POS locations, and access their accounts online and through mobile devices.

The institution's corporate banking services include current accounts, fund transfers, Letters of Credit, and Letters of Guarantee. The current accounts are reserved for entities with valid commercial/industrial registration. Wire fund transfers can be made from the client's account to any other global bank account. Letters of Credit are aimed at reducing counterpart risk and can be fully or partially covered by the client. Letters of Guarantee are intended to safeguard against contractual risk and can be domestic or foreign.

Additionally, the bank provides other common types of guarantees. Among these are tender/bid bonds, performance bonds, payment guarantees, and shipping guarantees.

See also
First Somali Bank
International Bank of Somalia

Notes

External links

Economy of Somalia
Companies of Somalia
Banks of Somalia
Bosaso
2011 establishments in Somalia
Banks established in 2011